Belinda Kanda (born 3 November 1982) is a Ghanaian footballer who plays as a midfielder. She has been a member of the Ghana women's national team.

Early life
Kanda was raised in Accra.

College career
Kanda has attended the Alabama A&M University in the United States.

International career
Kanda was part of the Ghana women's national football team at the 2003 FIFA Women's World Cup and 2007 FIFA Women's World Cup.

See also
List of Ghana women's international footballers

References

1982 births
Living people
Place of birth missing (living people)
Footballers from Accra
Ghanaian women's footballers
Women's association football midfielders
Alabama A&M Lady Bulldogs soccer players
Ghana women's international footballers
2003 FIFA Women's World Cup players
2007 FIFA Women's World Cup players
Ghanaian expatriate women's footballers
Ghanaian expatriate sportspeople in the United States
Expatriate women's soccer players in the United States